Chlorochlamys is a genus of moths in the family Geometridae.

Species
 Chlorochlamys appellaria Pearsall, 1911
 Chlorochlamys chloroleucaria (Guenée, 1857)
 Chlorochlamys phyllinaria (Zeller, 1872)
 Chlorochlamys triangularis Prout, 1912

References
 Chlorochlamys at Markku Savela's Lepidoptera and Some Other Life Forms
 Natural History Museum Lepidoptera genus database

Hemitheini